The Hamburg Bible (also Biblia Latina or The Bible of Bertoldus) a manuscript in The Royal Library, Denmark, inscribed in 2011 on UNESCO's Memory of the World Register.

The Hamburg Bible is a richly illuminated Latin Bible in three very large volumes made for the Cathedral of Hamburg in 1255. As a witness to the medieval book culture in Europe, it is a monument in its own right. It is the result of a small group of highly talented clergy- and craftsmen who not only exercised their skills to an extraordinary perfection, but also allowed themselves - or were allowed - to show their fascination of their own craft. The 89 illuminated initials contained in the three volumes illustrate themes of biblical books, with one illustrating the production of the medieval book, from the manufacturing of parchment at the beginning of the process to the illumination of initial letters when the work approached completion. The images are unique both as expressions of medieval art and as sources to the craft and history of the medieval book.

References

Memory of the World Register
13th-century biblical manuscripts
Royal Library, Denmark
13th-century illuminated manuscripts